The Drifter is a 2010 German film directed by Tatjana Turanskyj.

A 40-year-old female architect in Berlin loses her job and has to get along with identity, job centre and the loss of her social status.

Cast 
 Mira Partecke: Greta M.
 Katharina Bellena: economist Loretta
 Sven Seeger: dancer Sven
 Laura Tonke: callcenter boss Ann
 Torsten Haase: dancer Torsten
 Fabio Pink: dancer Fabio
 Michaela Benn: architect Marlene
 Ilia Papatheodorou: architect Francesca
 Thorsten Heidel: fellow student Max
 Andina Weiler: secretary Fee
 Angelika Sautter: Kracht
 Anna Schmidt: callcenter agent Annuschka

Awards 
 2010: nomination for the Teddy Award, the queer film award of the 60th Berlin International Film Festival
 Drehbuchstipendium von der Berliner Künstlerinnenförderung des Senats (Eine flexible Frau, High Potential)

References

External links 
 
 Offizielle Seite des Verleihs

2010 films
Films set in Berlin
2010s German films